Saravak (also Romanized as Sarāvak; also known as Sarābak) is a village in Khorram Dasht Rural District, in the Central District of Famenin County, Hamadan Province, Iran. At the 2006 census, its population was 1,474, in 364 families.

References 

Populated places in Famenin County